Conventer See is a lake in Mecklenburg-Vorpommern, Germany. At an elevation of -0.1 m, its surface area is 0.91 km².

External links 
 

Lakes of Mecklenburg-Western Pomerania